William Hector Maxwell Fry (22 August 1912 – 19 December 1965) was an Australian politician.

He was born in Launceston. In 1958 he was elected to the Tasmanian Legislative Council as the Liberal member for Launceston. He served until his death in 1965, although he quit the Liberal Party some time during his term.

References

1912 births
1965 deaths
Liberal Party of Australia members of the Parliament of Tasmania
Independent members of the Parliament of Tasmania
Members of the Tasmanian Legislative Council
20th-century Australian politicians